The Granfoss Tunnel is a set of two tunnels on Ring 3 in Oslo, Norway. The name comes from the Granfossen waterfall on the Lysakerelva river, which passes nearby. The two tunnels run from Lysaker to Mustad, and from Mustad to Ullern Church, respectively.

When the two tunnels with four lanes were opened for traffic, a bottleneck of Oslo's road system which had lingered for several decades was finally dissolved. The tunnels were financed by Oslo Package 1.

Despite there being two tunnels, the singular name is used in local parlance.

References
 

Road tunnels in Oslo
Tunnels in Bærum
Tunnels completed in 1992